André Derrien (July 31, 1895 – April 4, 1994) was a French sailor who competed in the 1928 Summer Olympics.

In 1928 he was a crew member of the French boat l'Aile VI which won the gold medal in the 8 metre class.

References 
 André Derrien's profile at databaseOlympics
 

1895 births
1994 deaths
French male sailors (sport)
Olympic gold medalists for France
Olympic sailors of France
Sailors at the 1928 Summer Olympics – 8 Metre
Olympic medalists in sailing

Medalists at the 1928 Summer Olympics
20th-century French people